The Free Hugs Campaign is a social movement involving individuals who offer hugs to strangers in public places. The hugs are meant to be random acts of kindness—selfless acts performed just to make others feel better. International Free Hugs Month is celebrated on the first Saturday of July and continues until August first.

The campaign in its present form was started in 2004 by an Australian man known only by the pseudonym "Juan Mann". The campaign became famous internationally in 2006 as the result of a music video on YouTube by the Australian band Sick Puppies, which has been viewed over 78 million times as of 25 September 2022.

History 

The Free Hugs campaign in its present form was started by Juan Mann on 30 June 2004, when he began giving out hugs in the Pitt Street Mall in central Sydney. In the months prior to this, Mann had been feeling depressed and lonely as a result of numerous personal difficulties. However, a random hug from a stranger made an enormous difference, with Mann stating that "...I went out to a party one night and a completely random person came up to me and gave me a hug. I felt like a king! It was greatest thing that ever happened."

Mann carried the now iconic "FREE HUGS" sign from the outset. However, on his first attempt in his hometown, where he returned to find that he was the only person he knew, as his friends and family had moved away, he had to wait fifteen minutes before an elderly lady came up to him and gave him a hug.

Initial distrust of Juan Mann's motives eventually gave way to a gradual increase of people willing to be hugged, with other huggers (male and female) helping distribute them. In October 2005 police told them they must stop, as Mann had not obtained public liability insurance worth $25 million for his actions. Mann and his companions used a petition to attempt to convince authorities that his campaign should be allowed to continue without the insurance. His petition reached 10,000 signatures. He submitted it and was allowed to continue giving free hugs.

Mann befriended Shimon Moore, then-lead singer for Sick Puppies, shortly after commencing his campaign, and over a two-month period in late 2005 Moore recorded video footage of Mann and his fellow huggers. Moore and his band moved to Los Angeles in March 2005 and nothing was immediately done with the footage. Meanwhile, Mann continued his campaign throughout 2005 and 2006 by appearing in Pitt Street Mall in Sydney most Thursday afternoons.

In mid-2006 Mann's grandmother died, and in consolation Moore made the music video using the footage he had shot in 2004 to send to Mann as a gift, stating in an interview that, "I sent it to him on a disc as a present and I wrote down 'This is who you are'." The video was later uploaded onto YouTube, where it has been viewed 74 million times as of October 2013.

On 30 October 2006, Mann was invited by Oprah Winfrey to appear on her show Oprah after her producer's doctor saw the Free Hugs video on YouTube. Juan Mann made an appearance outside her studio that morning, offering free hugs to the crowd waiting to see the taping of that day's episode. Oprah's camera crews caught several people in the audience hugging Mann as the morning progressed.

On 23 October 2007, Juan Mann announced his residential address online and offered an open invitation to anyone to come over and chat on-camera as part of his 'open-house project'. Mann hosted 80 guests over 36 days. On 25 November 2007, Mann's landlord threatened him with eviction, so he launched an online appeal.

On 25 December 2007, Juan Mann published an e-book as a free download. On 22 November 2008, at YouTube Live Sick Puppies did a performance of "All the Same" while Juan Mann gave hugs to crowd members. On 13 February 2009 a Free Hug Day took place.

Free hugs signs were also commonly seen at Phish shows at least as early as 1996.

A website that is generally recognized as the official site of the free hugs campaign, The Official Home of the Free Hugs Campaign, was launched in mid-2007. This site enables those involved in the campaign to better organize themselves and coordinate their efforts. Many initiatives resulted from these efforts. For example, on the website's forum (hosted on Dragon Arts), those involved in the campaign called for an annual International Free Hugs Day. Mann declared that the day would fall on the first Saturday following 30 June each year; this being the first date that Mann ever offered free hugs in Pitt Street Mall, Sydney in 2004. The first International Free Hugs Day was 7 July 2007, the second on 5 July 2008, and the third was on 4 July 2009. (See above regarding Valentine's Day).

Mann's Official Blog remained dormant after his apparent retirement but has been updated at times; it proclaims itself as the "true home" of the Free Hugs Campaign and hosts interviews conducted with individuals holding Free Hugs Campaigns internationally.

In Riyadh, Saudi Arabia, two men were arrested by the Commission for the Promotion of Virtue and Prevention of Vice for offering free hugs in a public space. The move was criticized on Twitter; however, others opposed the campaign altogether.

Publicity and expansion

 In October 2006, a college student, Yu Tzu-wei, began a campaign in Taipei to "hug everyone in Taiwan"
 In October 2006, a Free Hugs Campaign began in Tel Aviv, Israel.
 In late October 2006, several Free Hugs Campaigns were organized in a number of cities in Italy.
 On 27 October 2006, students Steve Loftus, Mark Wonnacott and Jeff Jones from Illinois-based McKendree University were featured in news media, including MLB.com, for giving free hugs before game five of the World Series in front of Busch Stadium.
 On 6 November 2006, a group of eleven people led by a 24-year-old man named 'Baigu' (白骨) tried the same campaign in Shanghai, only to be detained for one hour for not having a permit to hold a gathering in a public place.
 On 10 November 2006, A Free Hugs event in Boulder, Colorado, was covered by local media.
 On 18 November 2006, Geneva Online, an online community, organized the first Free Hugs event in Geneva, Switzerland.
 On 22 November, two Korean boy students organized a Free Hugs Campaign outside the Ngee Ann City shopping mall along Orchard Road, Singapore. In a novel bid to spread the festive cheer, they had this campaign for the following consecutive Saturdays.
 In late 2006 a Free Hugs Campaign commenced in Belgium with events on 22 and 23 December in Antwerp and on 30 December in Ghent.
 In March 2007, as part of an initiative to combat discrimination against people infected with AIDS or HIV, the French Government called on its citizens to embrace strangers who hoist signs in the street offering free hugs.
 On 14 April 2007, Portuguese waitress Sara Viera living in Newcastle Upon-Tyne, England was reported on both BBC News and local press to be giving Free Hugs in the streets of Newcastle City Centre.
 On 20 December 2008, Indian composer A. R. Rahman and percussionist Sivamani created a song titled "Jiya Se Jiya", inspired by the Free Hugs Campaign and promoted it through a video shot in various cities in India.
 In February 2009, a free hug offer startled downtown Toronto shoppers.
 In July 2009, a Jordanian radio station celebrated International Free Hugs Day by creating the first Free Hugs video from an Arab country.
 In August 2009, in Norway Free Hugs were offered by the Red Cross Youth in the yearly market "Steinkjermartnan".
 On 3 July 2010, The first "FREE HUGS Campaign for AIDS" was organized by a group of friends from a non-profit organization called "SHADOW of BODHI", at six different places at Chennai, India.
 Since 10 February 2011, a group of young people are organizing several events in Portugal, starting in the North and ending in the South. They already had several presences on Portuguese television and have been congratulated by the father of the campaign, Juan Mann. The group remains in activity and continues to give hugs around Portugal and soon hopes to spread love in the whole country. They had given hugs in Vila Nova de Famalicão and Braga (twice), Guimarães, Porto, Aveiro, Espinho, Coimbra and Lisbon. On 21 September, with Vincent Marx, Fernando Moinho and Edwin Bustos, they organized the event called "Free Hugs for World Peace". For 2012, they are trying to break the Guinness World Record for "Most People Hugging Each Other" in Vila Nova de Famalicão.
 In September 2012, Polish traveler, Maksym Skorubski went for a trip "Hugs Around The World in 80 days", during which he gave out free hugs to 6,783 people in 19 countries around the world. His tour was nominated by National Geographic Traveler as the best journey of 2012.
 Since early 2013, a group under the name 'Free Hugs Vienna' organizes several 'free hugs' events in Austria. They already had several actions organized in Vienna and some of their group members went free-hugging in events abroad as well. The most remarkable of these international events was the group's support in Conchita Wurst's Eurovision Song Contest 2014 campaign, in which the group opened their arms to embrace the message of tolerance through 'free hugs'.
 In November 2013 a Free hugs campaign has landed in Saudi Arabia after Bandr al-Swed, a Saudi young man released a video of him marching in the streets of the capital Riyadh offering free hugs to people of the Kingdom.
 From 2015 to 2019, in the month of May, members of the “Free Hugs Vienna” team were active during the Eurovision Song Contest week in Vienna (2015), Stockholm (2016), Kyiv (2017), Lisbon (2018) and Tel-Aviv (2019). Aligning with the event's motto “Building Bridges” (2015), "Come Together" (2016), "Celebrate Diversity" (2017), "All Aboard" (2018) and "Dare to Dream" (2019), the “free huggers” connected with members of the international press, fans and other guests in the Eurovision Press Center, Euro Fan Café and in front of the Eurovision arena on the days of the semi finals and final. 2019 is the sixth year in a row that "Free Hugs Vienna" is active in the ESC context in partnership with the Austrian broadcaster, ORF. (see above for more details)
 In 2014 and 2016, photos of a 12 year old Black child, Devonte Hart, went viral when he was photographed with "free hugs" signs during events around the Ferguson unrest in Ferguson, Missouri, and at protests following the shooting of Keith Lamont Scott in Charlotte, North Carolina. He was also photographed embracing a police officer in riot gear during a 2014 protest in Portland, Oregon. The image became known as the "hug felt 'round the world." The photo was used widely on social media to project an image of a loving, happy, multiracial family and world. In March 2018 the photographer, one of the adoptive mothers of the child, and her wife, killed the boy and his siblings in a murder-suicide family annihilation.

See also
 Samantha Hess
 Ken Nwadike Jr.
 Dominic Vos

References

External links

 Official Home of the Free Hugs Campaign
 Juan Mann's Official Blog, Founder of the Free Hugs Campaign
 
 The Illustrated Guide to Free Hugs , still online for free available via Scribd, visited 31 October 2013 
 The Illustrated Guide to Free Hugs, still online for free available as pdf, visited 8 December 2013
 

Social movements
2000s fads and trends
History of Sydney